Ihmeellinen Joosef is a Finnish novel written by Mika Waltari under his pseudonym M. Ritvala and published in 1938. He adopted it also as a play the same year.

Mika Waltari
20th-century Finnish novels
1938 Finnish novels